Tatafu Toma Moeaki (born 1972) is a Tongan politician, former Cabinet Minister, and civil servant.

Moeaki joined the Tongan public service in 1995, working as head of Policy and Planning at the Ministry of Education and as Deputy Secretary for Foreign Affairs. In 2011 he worked as chief executive of the Ministry of Labour, Commerce and Industries. In 2013 he was appointed chief executive of the Ministry of Finance and National Planning. He resigned as chief executive in 2016 to take up a position for the Asian Development Bank.

On 25 January 2021 he was appointed to Prime Minister Pohiva Tuʻiʻonetoa's Cabinet as Minister for Trade and Economic Development in the cabinet reshuffle following the resignation of Sione Vuna Fa'otusia.  After serving as a Minister he ran for the seat of Tongatapu 4 in the 2021 Tongan general election and was elected to the Legislative Assembly of Tonga. On 28 December 2021 he was appointed to the Cabinet of Siaosi Sovaleni as Minister of Finance and Minister of Revenue and Customs. On 6 May 2022 his election was voided after the Supreme Court found him guilty on two counts of bribery in an election petition. The conviction was stayed pending appeal on 26 May 2022. On 9 August 2022 his appeal was dismissed, and his election confirmed as void. He was formally unseated by Parliament on 10 August.

After being ousted from Parliament he was immediately hired as a project manager by the finance ministry. On 20 December 2022 he was appointed Governor of the National Reserve Bank of Tonga.

References

Living people
Members of the Legislative Assembly of Tonga
Government ministers of Tonga
Finance Ministers of Tonga
Tongan civil servants
1972 births
Governors of National Reserve Bank of Tonga